Urusi Airport  is a public use airport serving Urusi in the Beni Department of Bolivia. The runway is on the east bank of the Rapulo River.

See also

Transport in Bolivia
List of airports in Bolivia

References

External links 
OpenStreetMap - Urusi
OurAirports - Urusi
Fallingrain - Urusi Airport

Airports in Beni Department